Carmen Petra Basacopol (born 5 September 1926) is a Romanian composer and music teacher.

Life
Petra-Basacopol was born in Sibiu. She studied at the Bucharest Conservatory of Music between 1949–1956 with Ioan D. Chirescu (music theory), Leon Klepper, and Mihail Jora (composition), Paul Constantinescu (harmony) and Tudor Ciortea (musical analysis), Nicolae Buicliu (counterpoint), Theodor Rogalski (orchestration), Ion Vicol and Ion Marian (choir, choral conducting), Adriana Sachelarie and George Breazul (music history), Tiberiu Alexandru and Emilia Comișel (folklore), Silvia Căpățână and Ovidiu Drimba (piano). She attended improvisation classes at Darmstadt (1968) with György Ligeti, Erhard Karkoschka, Günther Becker, Christoph Caskel, Saschko Gawriloff, and Aloys Kontarsky.

Petra-Basacopol received her PhD from the University of Sorbonne in Paris. She became teaching assistant at the National University of Music Bucharest in 1962, becoming lecturer (1966–1972) and teacher of musical analysis and harmony later (1976–2003). She was also a teacher of harmony, counterpoint, music history and improvisation at the conservatory of Rabat (Morocco) between 1974 and 1976. 

She attended conferences, lectures, scientific communications in Romania and abroad (France, Angola, San Tomé and Principe).

Her music has been performed internationally and she has won a number of honors and awards.

Awards
She won the 4th place of the International Contest in Bucharest (1953), the International Youth Contest in Warsaw (1955), Meritul Cultural Order cls. IV (1969), The Composers Union Award (1974, 1979, 1999, 2003), The Romanian Composers Academy Award (1980), Meritul Cultural Order in knight rank (2004). She was jury member of the Harp Contest in Jerusalem (1979).

Writings 
She has published a number of professional articles, studies, music chronicles in papers as Muzica, Contemporanul, Informația Bucureștiului, Revista de Etnografie și Folclor and a book, L'originalité de la musique roumaine: á travers des oeuvres de chambre et de scène d'Enesco, Jora et Constantinesco, Editura Muzicală, București, 1979.

Works
Petra-Basacopol composes for orchestra, opera, chamber ensemble, harp, piano, vocal and ballet performance, often using themes and instruments from folk music. Among the 80 signed opuses, chamber music has a special place. Selected works include:

Theatre music 
1970 – Fata și masca op. 32, ballet

1980 – Miorița op. 47, ballet

1983 – Inimă de copil op.52, 2 acts opera for children

1986–1987 – Ciuleandra, op. 54, 2 acts ballet

1988–1990 – Apostol Bologa, op. 58, 2 acts opera

1995–1996 – Cei șapte corbi, op. 73, ballet for children

Vocal-symphonic music 
1966 – Crengile op.26, vision for moving choir and orchestra

1966 – Moartea căprioarei, op. 27- ballad for strings orchestra, clarinet, piano, percussion and solo baritone

1967 – Un cântec despre jertfe mari și despre lumină, op.28- cantata

1970 – Pulstio vitae op. 33 for harp, clarinet, xylophone, bells, percussion and moving choir

Symphonic music 
1956 – Symphony op. 6

1959 – Symphonic suite Țară de piatră op. 13

1961 – Piano and orchestra concert op. 19

1962 – Symphonic triptic op.20

1963 – Violin and orchestra concertino, op. 21

1965 – Violin and orchestra concert, no.2, op. 25

1975 – Harp, strings orchestra and timpani concert, op.40

1981 – Strings orchestra concert, op. 49

1982 – Cello and orchestra concert, op.51

1994 – Flute and chamber orchestra concert, op.71

1996 – Harp and strings orchestra concert, no.2, Rituale op. 75

Chamber music 
1950 – Flute and piano suite, op. 3

1952 – Cello and piano sonata, op. 4

1954 – Violin and piano sonata, op. 5

1957 – Three sketches for oboe and piano, op.8 nr. 2

1957 – Seven songs for soprano and piano, op.8 no. 1

1958 – Three Lieders for the mezzo-soprano and piano op. 9, nr. 1/ Three Lieders for Soprano and Piano Op. 9, nr. 2

1959 – Trio for Violin, cello and piano, op. 11/Lieders for mezzo-soprano and piano op. 12 nr. 1/Seasons op. 12 nr. 2 for soprano and piano

1960 – Images from Valea Crişului op. 16, no. 1 for harp and violin

1961 – Sonata for flute and harp op. 17/Three Lieders for Soprano and Piano Op. 18 no. 1

1963 – Five Lieders for tenor and harp op. 22, nr. 1

1964 – Nostalgia for baritone and English horn op. 23. nr. 1

1964 – Opium Flower Op. 23 nr. 2 for baritone and piano

1965 – Two Lieders for Soprano and Piano Op. 18 no. 2

1968 – Ofrnade op. 29 – two lieders for soprano and piano

1969 – Entertainment for harp, wind quartet, double bass and xylophone, octet op.30

1971 – Two Lieders for bass and harp op. 22 nr. 2/Propas op. 34 – three Lieders for soprano, flute and piano

1972 – Elegy for violin and piano op. 35

1972 – Moments for trumpet and piano op. 36

1974 – Trio for flute, clarinet and bassoon op. 39

1976 – Cântece haiducești for Baritone and Piano Op. 41. nr.1

1977 – Acuarele argheziene op. 91. nr. 2, two Lieders for the soprano and the lion

1978 – Craiul munților quartet op. 43 for flute, violin, cello and piano/Moroccan poems op.42 – three Lieders for mezzo-soprano and wind quartet

1979 – Variations on a Macedonian-Romanian theme op. 44 for harp and cello

1980 – Tablouri dacice op. 46, trio for pan flute, vibraphone and cello

1984 – Cântecele vieții op. 53-cycle 5 lieders for soprano and piano

1987 – Trio Op. 57 for flute, harp and clarinet/Sângele pământului op. 55 – three Lieders for bass and piano

1991– Ecouri op. 63 for 2 harps

1991 – Triptych for pan flute, and harp op.64

1992 – Entertainment op. 67 for wind quintet

1993– Imne op. 65 for soprano and piano/File de acatist for voice and flute/Low voice and piano Lieders. 70

1994 – Musica per cinque op. 72 for flute, harp, violin, viola and cello

1996 – Songs of Exile Op. 74; seven songs for soprano and piano

1998 – Triptych op. 79 for soprano and piano

1999 – Character pieces, op. 80 for oboe and piano

1999 – Lamaneto Op. 82 for 2 flutes and percussion

2000 – Dramatic Sonata Op. 83 for cello and piano/Psalms of David op.84 – five Lieders for soprano and piano/Meșterul Manole op.85 – five Lieders for soprano and piano

2001 – Viziuni dansante op. 86 for violin and piano/Naive paintings op. 91 for instrumental ensemble

2002 – Serenada op. 92 for 4 cellos/Fantasy Op. 94 for horn in F and piano/Măiastra op. 95 for instrumental ensemble/Hymn II op.93 – four Lieders for soprano and piano/Îngerul a strigat op. 96 – three Lieders for soprano and piano

2003 – Legandă op. 97 for violin and organ/ Elegie op. 96 for harp and clarinet/ Duo Opus op.100 for violin and viola/ Cântece imaginare op.99 for soprano and piano/ Diptic bucovian op.101/ Cântece naive pentru Nichita op.102/Mărturisiri op.104 for mezzo-soprano and piano

2004 – Piccolo sonata op. 105 for flute, contralto flute in G and pian/Variațiuni pe o temă elegiacă op.106 for 2 harps/Tristeți bacoviene op. 107 for low voice and piano

Choral music 
1960 – Fetelor, surorilor, op. 16 nr. 2 – female choir

1979 – Seasons, op. 45 nr.2 – 2 voice children choir

1980 – Salutul păcii, op.48 nr. 2 – 2 voice female choir

1992 – Psalmii op. 66 mixt choir

2001 – Sacred sings, mist a cappella choir

Instrumental music 
1949 – Rondo for piano op.2

1956 – 24 Imagini pitorești for piano op. 7

1958 – Solo harp suite op. 10

1973 – Solo flute improvisation op. 37

1978 – Cinci miniaturi pentru copii, op. 45 nr.1 pentru pian

1980 – Odă op. 48 nr. 1 pentru contrabas solo

1981 – Solo Cello Suite op. 50

1987 – Incantațiile pământului op. 56 pentru harpă solo

1990 – Imagini europene op 59 pentru harpă solo/Preludiu, Interludiu, Postludiu, op. 60 pentru orgă

1992 – The jungle book, op. 61; șapte piese pentru copii și pentru harpă solo

1993 – Mica sirenă op. 69 pentru harpă solo

1997 – Trei dansuri op 76 pentru harpă solo

1998 – 7 viziuni ale Profetului Ezechiel op. 78 pentru orgă

2001 – Improvizații op. 87 pentru pian/Incantații op. 88 pentru corn solo/Fantezii op. 89 pentru fagot solo

Discography 
Mansi Barberis, Carmen Petra-Basacopol, Liana Alexandra Șaptefrați, Irina Odăgescu-Țuțuianu, Cvartettino pentru coarde în stil neoclasic, Sonata pentru flaut și harpă, „Colaje” Pentru cvintet de alămuri, Sonata pentru vioară și pian, LP, Electrecord, ST-ECE 01545

Concert pentru harpă și orchestră, LP, Electrecord, ECE 01862

Concert pentru violoncel și orchestră Op. 51, Orchestra simfonică a Filarmonicii „George Enescu”, dirijor Cristian Mandeal, soloist Marin Cazacu; Ciuleandra – balet Op. 54, Orchestra simfonică a Radioteleviziunii Române, dirijor Modest Cichirdan, LP, Electrecord, ST-ECE 03736

Damase, Inghelbrecht, Lauber, Petra-Basacopol, Takemitsu, ... Muzică pentru Flaut și Harpă ..., BIS-CD-650, 1998

Elena Moșuc, Notre Amour, ... Zorile-si mâna cerbii de foc ..., CD, Arte Nova, 2002

References
 Viorel Cosma, Muzicieni români. Lexicon biobibliografic, Editura Muzicală, București, 2004, p. 353.
 Șerban Marcu, Repetitivitate și fantezie în „Primăvara”, poem pentru soprană, clarinet și pian de Carmen Petra-Basacopol, în revista Studia Musica, Universitatea Babeș-Bolyai, nr. 1 / 2013

External links
List of works

1926 births
Living people
20th-century classical composers
Women classical composers
Romanian classical composers
Musicians from Sibiu
National University of Music Bucharest alumni
University of Bucharest alumni
Academic staff of the National University of Music Bucharest
Women music educators
20th-century women composers